The 1970–71 Boise State Broncos men's basketball team represented Boise State College during the 1970–71 NCAA University Division basketball season. The Broncos were led by sixth-year head coach Murray Satterfield, and played their home games on campus at Bronco Gymnasium in Boise, Idaho.

No Broncos were named to the all-conference team; senior forward Ron Austin was on the second team.

There was no conference tournament, which debuted five years later in 1976.

References

External links
Sports Reference – Boise State Broncos – 1970–71 basketball season

Boise State Broncos men's basketball seasons
Boise State
Boise State